The 2018 Field hockey at the 2018 Asian Games Qualification was the direct qualification for the Field hockey at the 2018 Asian Games for men. It was held from the 7th until the 18th of March 2018 in Muscat, Oman.

Teams

Format
The eight teams will be split into two groups of four teams. The top two teams advance to the semifinals to determine the winner in a knockout system. The bottom two teams of each group play for the 5th to 8th place, also in a knockout system.

Results
''All times are local (UTC+04:00).

Preliminary round

Pool A

Pool B

Fifth to eighth place classification

7th/8th place

5th/6th place

First to fourth place classification

Semifinals

Third and fourth place

Final

Final standings

Goalscorers
10 goals

 Kin Kan Tsang

8 goals

 Roman Sarkar
 Felix Chi Him Iu
 Thanop Kampanthong

5 goals

 Ashraful Islam
 Basim Khatar Rajab
 Anuradha Rathnayake
 Sandaruwan Sudusinghe
 Chin Kun Liu
 Tsung-Jen Shih

4 goals

 Mamunur Rahman Chayan
 Deen Md. Emon
 Rashel Mahmud
 Angus Chan
 Dhammika Ranasingha
 Borirak Harapan
 Chun-Che Hu
 An-Szu Li

3 goals

 Milon Hossain
 Hasan Jubair
 Ching Ho
 Shung-Yin Kam
 Chi Wai Yu
 Rashad Al Fazari
 Imad Al Hasani
 Thanakrit Boon-Art
 Norrawich Intani
 Seksit Samoechai
 Ching-Chieh Hsu
 Tzu-Yu Huang
 Sung-Ting Lu

2 goals

 Farhad Shetful
 Hou-Fong Chan
 Martin Tsang
 Yerkebulan Dyussebekov
 Aman Yelubayev
 Mahmood Al Hasni 
 Asaad Mubarak Al Qasmi
 Khalid Al Shaaibi
 Salah Al-Saadi
 Wiros Yosiri
 Vong Lenbury
 Chia-Ching Huang

1 goal

 Abdul Achekzai
 Abdul Satari
 Sarower Hossain
 Naim Uddin
 Kwun Wa Cheun
 Windfall Monthong
 Chung Ming Siu
 Man Chun Tse
 Chun Hin Yu
 Yermek Tahskeyev
 Daulet Urmanov
 Tilek Uzbek
 Ahmed Al Nofali
 Marwan Al Raiisi
 Mahmood Bait Shamaiaa
 Damith Bandara
 Ishanka Doranegala
 Rajitha Kulathunga
 Nisman Maseela 
 Aphiwat Thanperm
 Cheng-Hao Chang

References

Qualification
Men's Asian Games
2018 Asian Games - Men's qualification
Field hockey at the Asian Games - Men's qualification
Sport in Muscat, Oman